The Qalb Loze massacre was a reported massacre of Syrian Druze on 10 June 2015 in the village of Qalb Loze in Syria's northwestern Idlib Governorate. The village was under the control of a coalition of Islamist rebels, when a Tunisian commander of one group in the coalition, the al-Nusra Front, tried to confiscate the house of one of the villagers who they accused of working for the Syrian government. The villagers protested and there were two different accounts of what followed. According to anti-government activists, the Nusra fighters opened fire on the protesting villagers, after the Tunisian commander accused them of blasphemy. In contrast, Nusra member Mohammad Feezo claimed it was the villagers who opened fire first. In the end, the al-Nusra Front killed 20 people, including the elderly and a child. The Druze were reported to have killed three members of al-Nusra Front, including the Tunisian. Two days later, a report put the number of Druze killed at 24.

The massacre sparked widespread condemnation in neighbouring Lebanon, which has a considerable Druze minority. Walid Jumblatt responded that "Any inciting rhetoric will not be beneficial, and you should remember that Bashar Assad’s policies pushed Syria into this chaos". In contrast, the Lebanese Druze party chief and former government minister Wiam Wahhab urged the Druze to form an armed force to defend their community in an angry televised speech saying “We will not accept to sell Druze blood!“. His call was much in line with that of the Syrian Druze spiritual leader who directed the Druze to join the Syrian Army. Subsequently, Druze fighters from Sweida assisted the Syrian Army in recapturing an airbase from the Nusra Front. Prior to the Qalb Loze killings, Nusra had forced hundreds of Druze to convert to Sunni Islam, as well as desecrating their graves and destroying shrines. On June 22, a group of Druze lynched a wounded Syrian in the Golan Heights who was being transported to Israel for treatment, as they claimed he was a rebel fighter.

See also
 List of massacres during the Syrian Civil War
 Druze in Syria

References

Massacres of the Syrian civil war in 2015
Massacres of the Syrian civil war perpetrated by the al-Nusra Front
History of the Druze
Mass murder in 2015
Persecution of Druze by Muslims